La Difficulté d'être infidèle is a 1964 French-Italian film directed by Bernard Toublanc-Michel. It was entered into the 14th Berlin International Film Festival.

Cast
 Danny Boy
 Michèle Grellier
 Gisèle Hauchecorne
 Carlo Nell
 Denise Péronne
 Bernard Tiphaine
 Donatella Turi
 Pierre Vernier

References

External links

1964 films
Italian comedy films
1960s French-language films
French black-and-white films
Films directed by Bernard Toublanc-Michel
1960s French films
1960s Italian films